Ebley Crossing Halt was opened on 12 October 1903 on what is now the Golden Valley Line between  and . This line was opened in 1845 as the Cheltenham and Great Western Union Railway from Swindon to Gloucester and this was one of many small stations and halts built on this line for the local passenger service.

History
The halt opened on 12 October 1903 with the introduction of the Great Western Railway (GWR) steam railmotor services between Stonehouse and Chalford.

The halt was at Ebley between Stroud and Stonehouse, and originally consisted of a pair of ground level platforms, but these were subsequently replaced by standard height platforms along with GWR pagoda style shelters. The platforms were later reconstructed in concrete and the down platform had a basic metal shelter. Access to the halt was from the adjacent foot crossing and for a while, a small wooden ticket office on the down side of the Stroud end of the platform, adjacent to the foot crossing.

Closure of the halt came on 2 November 1964 following the withdrawal of local stopping passenger services on the line. No trace of the halt remains today, although the foot crossing still exists.

Services
This halt was served by the Gloucester to Chalford local passenger services, known as the Chalford Auto.

References

Stroud District
Disused railway stations in Gloucestershire
Former Great Western Railway stations
Railway stations in Great Britain opened in 1903
Railway stations in Great Britain closed in 1964
Beeching closures in England